Gomara may refer to:

 Gomara, a Cimmerian city
 Gomara, a clan of the Bharwad community found in India
 Gómara, Soria, a municipality of Soria province, Spain
 Francisco López de Gómara, 16th-century Spanish historian and chronicler of the expedition of Hernán Cortés